Tessaracoccus antarcticus is a Gram-positive and facultatively anaerobic bacterium from the genus Tessaracoccus which has been isolated from soil from the Fildes Peninsula. Tessaracoccus antarcticus produces rhodopsin.

References 

Propionibacteriales
Bacteria described in 2020